Ardchonnell is a settlement on the east shore of Loch Awe in Argyll and Bute, Scotland.

References

Villages in Argyll and Bute